San Francisco Golden Gate Rugby Football Club is a rugby union club based in San Francisco, California. SFGG's first side competes in the Northern California Rugby Football Union's Men's Division I, Women's Division II, and Pacific Rugby Premiership.  The SFGG Youth Program includes high school Varsity, Junior Varsity, Frosh-Soph teams as well as U-12, U-10 and U-8 (non-contact) youth teams. SFGG also fields nationally competitive Rugby Sevens squads over the summer.  The SFGG Old Boys team, the Señors, feature in occasional matches.

History
SFGG Rugby was formed in 2001 from the merger of the San Francisco Rugby Club and the Golden Gate Rugby Club. The club won the 2009 and 2011 Rugby Super League championships defeating Life University in the final both times, by 23–13 and 20–5 respectively.

Ray Sheeran Field
San Francisco Golden Gate RFC leased land and a former PX building from the city of San Francisco on Treasure Island in the summer of 2005 for the purpose of building a field and clubhouse. The facility was opened in November 2005 with a Grand Banquet/Dedication featuring former All Black captain Reuben Thorne and former US Eagle captain Dan Lyle. The pitch was formerly named for former club President and current Director Greg Rocca. In March 2011, the pitch was renamed to Ray Sheeran Field.

Ray Sheeran Field hosted the 2008, 2009, 2010, 2011, and 2012 USA Rugby National Club Sevens Championships.

Club honors
Pacific Rugby Premiership
 Champions: 2014
USA Rugby Elite Cup
 Champions: 2013
 Rugby Super League
 Champions: 2009, 2011
 Runner-up: 2004, 2010
 Semifinalists: 2007
 US Men's Division I
Semifinalists: 1996, 2000, 2010
 Finalists: 1999

Notable players

Current players
Players with international caps in bold.
 

  Daniel La Prevotte
  Aaron Latzke
  Saimone Laulaupeaalu
  Shaun Paga
  Danny Barrett — flanker
  Patrick Latu — San Francisco Rush captain
  Volney Rouse — flyhalf
  Mile Pulu — center
  Tai Enosa — fullback

Former players
Internationally capped players are in bold.

  Brian Barnard
  Nathan Couch
  Tony Daly
  Philippe Farner
  Robbie Flynn
  Oloseti Fifita
  Fred Forster
  Jay Hansen
  Britt Howard
  Mike MacDonald
  Samu Manoa
  Fifita Mounga
  Jone Naqica
  Folau Niua
  Thretton Palamo — center
  Shawn Pittman
  Naima Reddick
  Mark Scharrenberg
  Matt Sherman
  Paul Still
  Grant Wells
  Jay Wilkerson

Sponsorship
Notable primary sponsors include CallidusCloud and Canterbury of New Zealand.  The club also has several secondary sponsorships from local and regional businesses.

References

External links
 

Golden gate
Rugby clubs established in 2001
2001 establishments in California